The 2022–23 UIC Flames men's basketball team represented the University of Illinois at Chicago in the 2022–23 NCAA Division I men's basketball season. The Flames, led by third-year head coach Luke Yaklich, played their home games at Credit Union 1 Arena in Chicago, Illinois as first-year members of the Missouri Valley Conference.

Previous season
The Flames finished the 2021–22 season 14–16, 9–10 in Horizon League play to finish in eighth place. In the Horizon League tournament, they beat Milwaukee in the first round before losing to Purdue Fort Wayne in the quarterfinals.

The season marked the Flames' final year in the Horizon League as the school announced it would join the MVC following the season.

Offseason

Departures

Incoming transfers

2022 recruiting class

Preseason 
The Flames were picked to finish in 11th place in the conference's preseason poll.

Roster

Schedule and results

|-
!colspan=12 style=| Exhibition

|-
!colspan=9 style=| Regular season

    
|-
!colspan=9 style=| Missouri Valley tournament
|-

|-

Source

References

UIC Flames men's basketball seasons
Uic
Uic
Uic